Thysanoptyx sordida is a moth in the subfamily Arctiinae. It was described by Arthur Gardiner Butler in 1881. It is found in Thailand, China and India (Darjeeling).

References

Arctiidae genus list at Butterflies and Moths of the World of the Natural History Museum

Moths described in 1881
Lithosiina